Prescott is a city in Yavapai County, Arizona, United States. According to the 2020 Census, the city's population was 45,827. The city is the county seat of Yavapai County.

In 1864, Prescott was designated as the capital of the Arizona Territory, replacing the temporary capital of Fort Whipple. The Territorial Capital was moved to Tucson in 1867. Prescott again became the Territorial Capital in 1877, until Phoenix became the capital in 1889.

Prescott has a rich history as a frontier gold and silver mining town. Mining and settlers brought frequent conflict with native American tribes in the area, including the Yavapai and Apache. Prescott was the home to Fort Whipple from its inception, which acted as a base for campaigns against natives. Prescott was a stereotypical "wild west" town during the latter half of the 19th century; famous residents included Doc Holliday and Virgil Earp of the gunfight at the O.K. Corral. The makeshift wooden town burned to the ground several times in the first decade of the 20th century, which finally resulted in the town being rebuilt in brick. The modern city subsists off of tourism, especially around its storied past. It is host to the self-proclaimed "World's Oldest Rodeo", running continuously since 1888. The rodeo, one of the most famous in the United States, draws some 35,000 tourists a year.

This also sometimes refers to central Yavapai County in general, which would include the towns of: Mayer, Paulden, Wilhoit, and Williamson Valley. Combined with these smaller communities, the area had a population of 103,260 . Prescott is the center of the Prescott Metropolitan Area, defined by the U.S. Census Bureau as all of Yavapai County.

The Yavapai-Prescott Indian Tribe reservation is adjacent to and partially within the borders of Prescott.

Prescott is in the Granite Creek watershed and contains the convergence of Miller Creek and Granite Creek on its north side.

History

Prescott was originally inhabited by the indigenous Yavapai, who had split off from Patayan groups around 1300 AD. The first recorded European contact with the Yavapai was made by Spaniard Antonio de Espejo in 1583, who was looking for gold. Until the 1860s, there was no permanent European presence. The territory was explored by the Walker Party in 1862 and 1863. Walker and his men discovered gold at Hassayampa Creek, just south of Prescott, in 1863. Further gold was struck at nearby Lynx Creek, Weaver Creek, and Big Bug. With the backing of Ohio railroad magnates, the Arizona Organic Act establishing the Arizona Territory was pushed through in February 1863. The land was now open to settlers. Fort Whipple was established the same year near present day Chino Valley. The fort was also made the territorial capital.

Arizona Territorial Governor John Noble Goodwin selected the site of Prescott following his first tour of the new territory. Goodwin replaced Governor John A. Gurley, appointed by Abraham Lincoln, who died before taking office. Downtown streets in Prescott are named in honor of both of them. Goodwin selected a site south of the temporary capital on the east side of Granite Creek near a number of mining camps. The new town was named in honor of historian William H. Prescott during a public meeting on May 30, 1864. Robert W. Groom surveyed the new community, and an initial auction sold 73 lots on June 4, 1864. By July 4, 1864, 232 lots had been sold within the new community. Prescott was incorporated in 1881.

The mineral wealth of Prescott included a good quantity of both gold and silver, and made the hamlet the most important city in northern Arizona. It also escalated the American Indian Wars, as pioneers and natives increasingly attacked the other, in ever bloodier reprisals. Tribes also chose sides against each other, with the Maricopa and O'odham fighting alongside American and Mexican settlers against the Yavapai and Apache in brutal campaigns. The Hualapai War broke out in northern Arizona in 1865, which brought a period of guerilla warfare, though few pitched battles. Not until 1935 were the Yavapai given a reservation in Prescott, and at first only a mere  directly adjacent to Fort Whipple. An extra  were provided in 1956.

The mining camps brought much prosperity, but also much racism. On July 12, 1863, the miners of Lynx Creek passed a resolution banning Asian and Mexican miners. Similar resolutions were passed in the other mining districts. Since there was no extant Mexican population, there was little to temper the racism of new Anglos from the Eastern United States. There were also very few women on the frontier at the time; an 1864 census found just 40. 31 were Mexican, which, combined with the racism of the territory, led to frequent allegations of sexual promiscuity. By the 1870s, as Prescott became increasingly "civilized", it took on the values of Victorian society, including its sexual standards. There were exceptions, however. Mary DeCrow, a white woman, arriving around 1863, had a relationship with a black Texan, breaking taboos around miscegenation. She later married a Mexican blacksmith, starting a boarding house with him; public opinion calmed down after this and she eventually became much loved. Another legendary Prescott woman, Mary Sawyer, wore men's clothes, drank hard, swore hard, and worked a mining claim. Sawyer's breaking of gender norms however resulted in her 1877 institutionalization in an insane asylum, in which she remained until her death in 1902.

Prescott served as capital of Arizona Territory until November 1, 1867, when the capital was moved to Tucson by act of the 4th Arizona Territorial Legislature. The capital was returned to Prescott in 1877 by the 9th Arizona Territorial Legislature. The capital was finally moved to Phoenix on February 4, 1889, by the 15th Arizona Territorial Legislature. The three Arizona Territory capitals reflected the changes in political influence of different regions of the territory as they grew and developed.

Prescott also holds a place in the larger history of the American southwest. Both Virgil Earp (brother of Wyatt Earp) and Doc Holliday lived in Prescott before their now infamous gunfight at the O.K. Corral. Virgil Earp lived in Prescott starting in 1878 as a constable/watchman. Doc Holliday was there for a while in the summer of 1880 and even appears in the 1880 census records.

The Sharlot Hall Museum houses much of Prescott's territorial history, and the Museum of Indigenous People (formerly the Smoki museum) and Phippen Museum also maintain local collections. Whiskey Row in downtown Prescott boasts many historic buildings, including The Palace, Arizona's oldest restaurant and bar. Many other buildings have been converted to boutiques, art galleries, bookstores, and restaurants. Prescott is home to the Arizona Pioneers' Home. The Home opened during territorial days, February 1, 1911.

After several major fires in the early part of the century, downtown Prescott was rebuilt with brick. The central courthouse plaza, a lawn under huge old elm trees, is a gathering and meeting place. Cultural events and performances take place on many nights in the summer on the plaza.

Barry Goldwater, the 1964 Republican nominee for president, launched his presidential campaign from the steps of Prescott's Yavapai County Courthouse.

Notable wildfires 
Yarnell Hill Fire: Nineteen members of the Granite Mountain Hotshots, part of the Prescott Fire Department, died on Sunday, June 30, 2013, while battling the wildfire that had ignited two days earlier south of Prescott.

Goodwin Fire: The wildfire ignited in the Bradshaw Mountains south of Prescott on Saturday, June 24, 2017. The fire eventually led to the evacuations of Mayer and Walker a few days later. State Route 69 was partially closed between the towns of Mayer and Dewey-Humboldt.

Geography

Prescott is considered part of North Central Arizona, sitting just north of the Bradshaw Mountains and east of the Sierra Prieta range. The Granite Dells, often called ‘The Dells’, lies just north of the Prescott city center and is known for its large boulder outcroppings of granite that have eroded into a spectacular appearance of bumpy rock features. Within 'The Dells' are Watson and Willow Lakes, which are two small, man-made reservoirs. Here a number of hiking trails connect to the Peavine Trail. The Peavine National Recreation Trail follows what was the former rail bed of the Santa Fe. This railroad traveled from Prescott to Phoenix through the Granite Dells. The "Peavine" got its name from the winding portion of this railroad that twists and curves, resembling the vine on which peas grow. The Peavine trail connects to the Iron King Trail, which was the route of the old Prescott Railroad through the Granite Dells. Other lakes include Lynx, Granite Basin and Goldwater, all surrounding different areas of this rustic community. Lynx Lake is another lake close to Prescott in tall ponderosa pines, and gets some 125,000 visitors every year. This  lake offers visitors recreational activities, boating, camping, fishing, hiking, mountain biking, picnicking and a small, seasonal restaurant with a view of the lake. None of these lakes permit swimming due to a history of water quality problems, however all are popular recreational destinations near Prescott.

Granite Creek flows generally north from the Bradshaw Mountains through the city, the Granite Dells, and the Little Chino Valley to the Verde River.

Climate
The city has a Mediterranean climate (Köppen Csa) bordering on a Humid subtropical climate (Köppen Cwa); however, unlike most other locations in this climate class, there is a pronounced summer wet season due to the North American Monsoon.

Snowfall is typically light and snow cover usually melts away quickly; the average seasonal total was .The largest portion of precipitation falls during the July–September monsoon season. Average daytime temperatures remain above  the entire year, but diurnal temperature variation is large throughout the year, averaging nearly  annually. On average, temperatures reach  on 44 days annually, though + readings are uncommon and occur only 1–2 days per year on average, much unlike the Sonoran Desert to the south and Mojave Desert to the west. The average season for freezing temperatures is October 21 through May 1.

Temperature extremes are fairly widespread. Due to the large diurnal temperature variation, cold winter days are rare, but being far inland causes a variability which occasionally leads to ice days. Warm summer nights are rare due to being on an elevated plain, but happen on occasion.

There was a severe drought from 1999 to 2009, seen from the lack of snowpack in the Bradshaw Mountains. Local creeks do not contain water except immediately after the rare rains. Nevertheless, at the start of 2007 lakes were reported as full.

Monsoon season 
Prescott is affected each year by the North American Monsoon. Monsoon season is June 15–Sept. 15, and brings significant rain, wind, hail, thunderstorms, and flooding to the area. In spite of the dangers of flash floods and wildfires, many locals enjoy monsoon season for the relief of cooler temperatures, which commonly result from storms during the height of summer heatwaves.

Arizona receives half of its annual rainfall during monsoon season, but this can be misleading. Monthly averages in precipitation can give the false impression that rains are confined to monsoon season, while single-day annual rainfall records have been set far outside of monsoon season, repeatedly. The area is prone to weather extremes and often, monthly rainfall records are actually the result of one or two dramatic rain events.

Flood risk
Prescott area residents have faced the challenges of extreme rain and flash flooding since the first prospectors arrived in search of gold in the late 1800s. In 1863 Joseph R. Walker's original mining camp on the banks of Lynx Creek was completely swept away in a flash flood less than a year after arriving in Prescott. In the late 1880s, floods destroyed the first dam on Lynx creek near present-day SR-69. 1891 brought the heaviest flooding on record across Arizona (a record broken in 1993), carving lasting changes to the Verde river drainage, bordering Prescott. The Verde, which has in some years been completely dry, gushed with 4,284 cubic meters per second of water on Feb 24, 1891, or about half the size of the Columbia river.

Tropical Storm Octave, in 1983, brought 14.5" of rain to parts of Prescott in less than forty-eight hours. Damages included the Santa Fe Railway, which was washed out in so many places it was completely abandoned the following year. Two Prescott area college students died in Granite Creek during flooding in 2004, which brought an official state of emergency declaration from state governor Napolitano. Significant flooding has been recorded as recently as 2018, prompting the evacuation of nearby Mayer in August.

A large number of homes in Prescott are located within FEMA designated "high risk flood zones A and AE". The City of Prescott recently updated Flood Insurance Rate Maps in response to increased construction and notable flooding for several consecutive years.

Demographics

As of the census of 2000, there were 33,938 people, 15,098 households, and 8,968 families residing in the city. The racial makeup of the city was 92.9% White, 0.5% Black or African American, 1.3% Native American, 0.8% Asian, 0.1% Pacific Islander, 2.8% from other races, and 1.6% from two or more races. 8.2% of the population were Hispanic or Latino of any race.

There were 15,098 households, out of which 18.1% had children under the age of 18 living with them, 48.7% were married couples living together, 7.9% had a female householder with no husband present, and 40.6% were non-families. 32.1% of all households were made up of individuals, and 15.2% had someone living alone who was 65 years of age or older. The average household size was 2.11 and the average family size was 2.62.

In the city, the population was spread out, with 15.9% under the age of 18, 11.2% from 18 to 24, 18.9% from 25 to 44, 27.3% from 45 to 64, and 26.8% who were 65 years of age or older. The median age was 48 years. For every 100 females, there were 96.9 males. For every 100 females age 18 and over, there were 94.3 males.

The median income for a household in the city was $35,446, and the median income for a family was $46,481. Males had a median income of $31,834 versus $22,982 for females. The per capita income for the city was $22,565. About 7.4% of families and 13.1% of the population were below the poverty line, including 14.4% of those under age 18 and 6.4% of those age 65 or over.

Economy

The Prescott Gateway Mall is an enclosed shopping mall that opened in 2002, replacing Ponderosa Plaza, which was Prescott's first enclosed mall when it opened in 1980.

Downtown Prescott has dozens of independently owned and operated shops.

Top employers
According to the city's 2021 Comprehensive Annual Financial Report, the top employers in Prescott are:

Other major area employers include the Yavapai-Prescott Tribe, the James Family Prescott YMCA, and Fann Contracting.

Places of interest and culture 

Prescott has many Victorian style homes. Prescott has 809 buildings on the National Register of Historic Places. The tallest house in North America, Falcon Nest is in Prescott, on the slope of Thumb Butte.

Prescott is home to the downtown historical area known as Whiskey Row. Adjacent to Whiskey Row was the red-light district which operated until 1917, at which point prostitution was outlawed in the state of Arizona. In 1900, a great fire destroyed almost all of the buildings on Whiskey Row, including the 1891 Hotel Burke, advertised as "the only absolutely fireproof building in Prescott". By legend, the patrons of the various bars simply took their drinks across the street to the Courthouse square and watched it burn. At the time of the fire, patrons removed the entire bar and back-bar of the Palace Restaurant & Saloon to the square by the patrons as the fire approached, re-installing it after the gutted brick structure was rebuilt. Whiskey Row runs north and south on Montezuma St. between Gurley and Goodwin St., directly west of the county courthouse. This single city block has been the home of the St. Michael's Hotel (formerly the Hotel Burke) and the Palace Hotel since the late 19th century, along with other colorful purveyors of nightlife. Originally built in 1877, The Palace Restaurant and Saloon was rebuilt after the fire, and is now the state's oldest continuous business. Merchant Sam Hill's large hardware store was near Whiskey Row.

Prescott is host to the self-proclaimed "World's Oldest Rodeo", running continuously since 1888. Also known as "Frontier Days", it runs in the days leading up to Fourth of July. It is one of the most famous rodeos in the United States. In the 2010s, it drew over 35,000 tourists a year, nearly doubling Prescott's population for the rodeo week. During the same period, some 45,000 people also attend the Rodeo Parade, which winds through downtown Prescott. Though several other rodeos pre-date Prescott's by decades, Prescott claims it was the first to charge admission and turn it into a spectator sport. This is backed up by a 1985 trademark on "World's Oldest Rodeo". The rodeo was featured in the 1972 film Junior Bonner.

Prescott hosts annual events such as Frontier Days, Easter Egg-Stravaganza, the Bluegrass Festival, Earth Day, July 4 Celebration, Tsunami on the Square, art festivals, a Cinco de Mayo celebration, Navajo Rug Auction, Pumpkin Patch Carnival, World's Largest Gingerbread Village at the Prescott Resort & Conference center (on the Yavapai-Prescott Indian Tribe reservation), Prescott Film Festival, Folk Arts Fair, parades, the Acker Music Festival, The Cowboy Poets Gathering, the Prescott Highland Games, Courthouse Lighting, Whiskey Off Road and Ragnar Relay Del Sol. On New Year's Eve, historic Whiskey Row saw the inaugural Prescott Boot Drop to usher in the 2012 New Year. Also in Prescott is the Heritage Park Zoo.

There are four golf courses within the city limits: Antelope Hills Golf Course, which consist of the City of Prescott South Course and the City of Prescott North Course, Capital Canyon Golf Club (formerly the Hassayampa Golf Club) (private), Talking Rock Golf Club (private), and Prescott Lakes Golf Club (private). More public courses are located nearby in surrounding towns.

Prescott is home to The Arizona Pioneers' Home, a continuing care retirement home, operated and funded by the State of Arizona, originally intended for impoverished Arizona founders from Territorial days. Initially the home was built to house 40 men, but in 1916 an addition of a women's wing was completed to provide for 20 women. Later, in 1929, the home again expanded to include Arizona's Hospital for Disabled Miners (current total capacity is 150 beds). Scenes from the 2008 movie Jolene were filmed in the Pioneer's Home in 2006. The Home has had many colorful residents, including a John Miller, who claimed to be Billy the Kid, and who was exhumed from the Pioneer's Home Cemetery in 2005 in an attempt to identify DNA evidence. Another resident was "Big Nose Kate" Elder, who would also be laid to rest in the Pioneer's Home Cemetery, though not without controversy.

Prescott is home to Prescott College, a small liberal arts college just west of the downtown area that emphasizes environmental and social justice. It is a non-profit organization which has an undergraduate body of roughly 800 students, and an average student to faculty ratio of 7:1 in on-campus classrooms. There are four general programs at Prescott College: the On-campus Undergraduate Program (RDP), Limited-Residency Undergraduate Degree Program (ADP), the Limited-Residency Master of Arts Program (MAP), and a Limited-Residency PhD program in Sustainability Education. Those enrolled in the Limited-Residency programs work with various mentors and Prescott College faculty, usually in their home communities. On-campus students live in Prescott and attend classes at the college itself.

Prescott was at one point a recovery destination, with over 200 sober living homes dedicated to drug or alcohol recovery. However, increased regulation and enforcement has whittled the number down to less than 30 as of June 2018.

The cultures of Prescott's recovery community, the students at Prescott College, and preexisting small town punk subculture have fostered a thriving punk scene. Shows are hosted weekly at house venues, tattoo shops, and bars throughout downtown and the Dexter neighborhood. Prescott has been home to several nationally known punk bands, including Bueno, Life in Pictures, and Hour of the Wolf. Local bands often play shows alongside touring bands, who include Prescott in their tours.

Prescott was the location of Arizona's first Elks Lodge (BPOE). In December 1895 a group of enterprising businessmen in Prescott established the Prescott Elks Lodge #330, known as the "Mother Lodge of Arizona". The Prescott Elks Opera House was built by the lodge in 1905. The Prescott Elks Lodge is in Prescott Valley.

Designations
Prescott was designated "Arizona's Christmas City" by Arizona Governor Rose Mofford in 1989.

Other notable designations include:

2000: Downtown Historic Preservation District (which includes "Whiskey Row") – one of 12 such National Register Historic Districts within the city.

2004: A "Preserve American Community" in 2004 by First Lady Laura Bush.

2006: One of a "Dozen Distinctive Destinations" by the National Trust for Historic Preservation.

2008: Yavapai Courthouse Plaza recognized as one of the first ten "Great Public Places" in America by the American Planning Association.

2012: Number 1 True Western Town of the Year for 2011 by True West Magazine and One of the 61 Best Old House Neighborhoods in the U.S and Canada by This Old House Magazine.

Government
The City of Prescott operates under a council-manager form of government. The council has six council members and a mayor, all elected at-large by the people of Prescott. Council members are elected to staggered four-year terms, and the mayor to a two-year term. Elections for mayor and council members are held in the first year after the national presidential and mid-term elections to keep national issues from overshadowing local concerns. Mayoral and council elections are non-partisan. There are no term limits for council members or the mayor. The council appoints a professional city manager to oversee the daily administrative operations of city services and their respective departments, including the Prescott Fire Department. The current city manager is Michael Lamar. The current mayor is Phil Goode, elected in 2021. Council members as of June 2022 are Cathy Rusing (Mayor Pro-Tem), Jessica Hall, Brandon Montoya, Eric Moore, Steve Sischka, and Clark Tenney.

Education

Higher education
Yavapai College
Embry–Riddle Aeronautical University, Prescott
Prescott College

K-12
Prescott High School
Mile High Middle School (serves seventh and eighth grades)
Granite Mountain Middle School (serves fifth and sixth grades)
BASIS Schools
Northpoint Expeditionary Learning Academy
Tri-City College Prep High School

Prescott Unified School District operates public schools. There are 18 public schools, including five charter schools, in grades K-12 and four private schools in Prescott. In 2015, due to budget cuts, the Prescott Unified School District closed Washington Elementary and Miller Valley Elementary schools. To make up for the change all elementary schools only went up to fourth grade. Granite Mountain Middle School serves fifth and sixth grades. Mile High Middle School serves seventh and eighth grades and Prescott High School remains unchanged.  A district preschool has been operating in the Washington Elementary since the latter's closure.  A recent renovation of the building will be completed in 2018 and will also be the home of the Prescott Unified School District Offices.

Transportation

As of 2021, United Airlines operates commercial flights from Prescott to Denver and Los Angeles. Ground shuttle services are also available from the Prescott area to Phoenix Sky Harbor International Airport.

The three main thoroughfares in and around Prescott are Arizona State Route 89A, Arizona State Route 69 and Arizona State Route 89. State Route 89A connects Sedona and Cottonwood to Northern Prescott and meets with State Route 89 near the Airport eventually turning into Pioneer Parkway where it connects to Williamson Valley Road. State Route 89 travels mostly north–south and connects Prescott with Chino Valley and Paulden to the north, continuing northward until it joins Interstate 40 at mile marker 146, Ash Fork.

In 2016, ADOT realigned Willow Creek Road between State Route 89 and Pioneer Parkway adding a roundabout on State Route 89 with new access to the Ernest A. Love Field Airport. A future Great western Corridor is planned go on the east side of the Ernest A. Love Field Airport and provide an alternative route to the Airport.

Yavapai Regional Transit provides local bus service connecting Prescott and Chino Valley.

Notable people

Nearest cities and towns

 Chino Valley
 Groom Creek
 Iron Springs
 Highland Park, Yavapai County, Arizona
 Prescott Valley
 Wildwood Estates
 Yavapai Hills

Sister cities
, Prescott has three sister cities:
  Caborca, Sonora, Mexico
  Suchitoto, El Salvador
  Zeitz, Saxony-Anhalt, Germany

See also

 List of historical markers in Prescott, Arizona

Further reading
 
 
 
 )

References

External links

 City of Prescott website 
 City of Prescott tourism website
 Prescott Arizona Chamber of Commerce

135 Years Ago Today a Capital is Born Named Prescott, by Earl Hoagberg, Sharlot Hall Archive & Library, May 1999.
Many Prescott places take their name from 1850s surveyor, By Harley G. Shaw, harlot Hall Archive & Library, August 2000.

Sister projects

 
Cities in Yavapai County, Arizona
County seats in Arizona
Former colonial and territorial capitals in the United States
Populated places established in 1864
Cities in Arizona
Metropolitan areas of Arizona